Gudenus is the name of the prominent German noble family, originated from Hesse, Germany, which can trace their ancestry up to 16th century. The family was divided into two lines. First line which held the title of Count, awarded to them on 22 October 1907, settled in Austria, while the other line of the family which held the title of Baron, granted to them on 15 April 1756, settled in Styria and Hungary.

Notable members 
Moritz Gudenus (1596-1680), German Catholic preacher and progenitor of the Gudenus family
Johann Baptist, Graf von Gudenus (1908–1968), Austrian sprinter and bobsledder 
John, Graf von Gudenus (1940–2016), Austrian politician and member of the Federal Council of Austria
Johann, Graf von Gudenus (b. 1976), Austrian politician involved in the "Ibiza affair"

Surnames
German-language surnames